Hajdin Salihu (born 18 January 2002) is an Albanian professional footballer who plays as a centre-back for Croatian club Lokomotiva.

Club career

Early career and Llapi
Salihu is a product of the two most famous football schools in Kosovo, Besiana and Kurda. On 19 June 2018, he joined Football Superleague of Kosovo side Llapi, and received squad number 15. On 1 November 2019, he made his debut in a 1–0 home win against Drenica after being named in the starting line-up.

Lokomotiva

Period on loan
On 18 October 2020, Salihu joined Croatian First League side Lokomotiva, on a season-long loan. On 27 February 2021, he was named as a Lokomotiva substitute for the first time in a league match against Šibenik. His debut with Lokomotiva came fourteen days later in a 0–0 home draw against Istra 1961 after being named in the starting line-up.

Return as a permanent player
On 9 July 2021, Salihu signed a two-year contract with Croatian First League club Lokomotiva, transfer which was officially confirmed seventeen days later. Eight days later, he was named as a Lokomotiva substitute for the first time in a league match against Hajduk Split.

Short-time loan at Laçi and return from loan
On 17 January 2022, Salihu joined Kategoria Superiore side Laçi, on a season-long loan. Five days later, he was named as a Laçi substitute for the first time in a league match against Teuta Durrës. On 10 February 2022, Salihu returned from loan to replace one of Lokomotiva's injured defenders. Two days later, he played the first game after the return against Istra 1961 after being named in the starting line-up.

International career

Kosovo
Salihu represented Kosovo U17 in the 2019 UEFA European Under-17 Championship qualifications, helping Kosovo top their group in the qualifying round. He also represented Kosovo at U19 and U21 level with the latter was part in two 2021 UEFA European Under-21 Championship qualification matches as an unused substitute.

Albania
On 16 March 2021, Lokomotiva through a communiqué stated that Salihu switched his allegiance to Albania U21 and received the call-up for the March gathering. On 20 March 2021, he received a call-up from Albania U21 for a training camp held from 22–30 March 2021 and for unofficial friendly match against Tirana and Bylis.

References

External links

2002 births
Living people
Sportspeople from Podujevo
Kosovo Albanians
Albanian footballers
Albanian expatriate footballers
Albanian expatriate sportspeople in Croatia
Kosovan footballers
Kosovo youth international footballers
Kosovan expatriate footballers
Kosovan expatriate sportspeople in Croatia
Kosovan expatriate sportspeople in Albania
Association football central defenders
Football Superleague of Kosovo players
KF Llapi players
Croatian Football League players
NK Lokomotiva Zagreb players